Catia may refer to:

Catia, Caracas, a neighbourhood of Caracas, Venezuela
Catia La Mar, a town in Venezuela
Catia (gens), a family in Ancient Rome
Catia (skipper), a genus of butterfly
CATIA, Computer Aided Three-dimensional Interactive Application

See also 
 Katia (disambiguation)